Mzayifani Buthelezi is a South African Air Force officer serving as Acting Chief of the Air Force.

He was appointed Deputy Chief of the Air Force from 1 June 2017.

References

|-

South African Air Force generals
Living people
1965 births
People from Durban